The 2020 Sun Belt Conference men's soccer season was the 19th season of men's varsity soccer in the Sun Belt Conference (SBC). The regular season began on September 18 and concluded on November 6, 2020. The season culminated with the Sun Belt Tournament which began on November 13 and concluded on November 15, 2020.

Background

Impact of the COVID-19 pandemic on the season

The COVID-19 pandemic drastically affected the landscape of men's soccer in the Sun Belt Conference. Long-time program, Appalachian State suspended its men's varsity soccer program in the wake of the pandemic, due to anticipated budget cuts in the athletics program. Additionally, Sun Belt associate member Howard opted out of playing during the fall season due to concerns with the ongoing pandemic.

The SBC and Atlantic Coast Conference were the only two men's soccer conferences that played during fall 2020.

The conference opted to play a six-match season with all programs doing a home-and-home series, or double round robin against every program in the conference. Most teams completed the fall season playing only 8–12 matches instead of the normal 15–18 matches.

Discontinuation of men's soccer
Appalachian State's decision to drop men's soccer was the first move that led to the discontinuation of SBC men's soccer after the 2020–21 school year. In July 2020, Howard announced that it would become an associate member of the Northeast Conference in six sports, with men's soccer being one of four sports moving in July 2021. This left the SBC with only four men's soccer members, two less than the six required to maintain an automatic NCAA tournament berth. The next move that affected SBC men's soccer came in January 2021, when the ASUN Conference announced three schools as incoming full members, including SBC associate Central Arkansas. The following month saw Coastal Carolina announce that it would become a single-sport member of Conference USA (C-USA), joining another in-state C-USA associate in South Carolina. This left Georgia Southern and Georgia State as the only remaining Sun Belt men's soccer programs, and those two schools announced they would move that sport to the Mid-American Conference in late May 2021.

Return of Sun Belt men's soccer
A major conference realignment initially triggered in July 2021 when Oklahoma and Texas announced their plans to leave the Big 12 Conference for the Southeastern Conference eventually led to the reinstatement of Sun Belt men's soccer. Further moves in this realignment cycle saw three men's soccer schools announce that they would join the SBC no later than 2023: Colonial Athletic Association member James Madison, and then-reigning national champion Marshall and Old Dominion from Conference USA. Accordingly, league commissioner Keith Gill announced on November 1, 2021 that SBC men's soccer would be reinstated no later than 2023.

Teams

Stadiums and locations

Head coaches

Preseason

Preseason poll
The preseason poll was released on August 27, 2020.

Preseason national polls
Due to the ongoing COVID-19 pandemic, only College Soccer News released a preseason poll.

Preseason honors
Defensive Player – Preseason All-Conference
 Alberto Suarez, Central Arkansas

Offensive Player – Preseason All-Conference
 Aris Briggs, Georgia State

Regular season

Conference results

For the 2020 season, each team plays every other conference team twice; once home and once away.

Weekly results
Legend

All times Eastern time.

Week 1 (Sep. 14 – Sept. 20)

Week 2 (Sep. 21 – Sept. 27)

Week 3 (Sep. 28 – Oct. 4)

Week 4 (Oct. 5 – Oct. 11)

Week 5 (Oct. 12 – Oct. 18)

Week 6 (Oct. 19 – Oct. 25)

Week 7 (Oct. 26 – Nov. 1)

Week 8 (Nov. 2 – Nov. 8)

Players of the Week honors

Postseason

Sun Belt Tournament

All four teams qualified for the modified Sun Belt Conference Men's Soccer Tournament. The tournament was played from November 13–15, with Coastal Carolina winning the championship in penalties over Georgia State.

NCAA Tournament 
The winner of the 2020 SBC Tournament will earn an automatic berth into the 2020 NCAA Division I Men's Soccer Tournament. Due to the COVID-19 pandemic, the tournament was postponed from November/December 2020 to April/May 2021.

Postseason awards and honors

MLS SuperDraft

The 2021 MLS SuperDraft will be held in January 2021.

Total picks by school

List of selections

Notable undrafted players
The following players went pro after the 2020 season despite not getting drafted in the 2021 MLS draft.

References

External links
 Sun Belt Conference Men's Soccer

 
2020 NCAA Division I men's soccer season
Association football events curtailed due to the COVID-19 pandemic